Eddy Heurlié (born 27 December 1977 in Le Lamentin) is a Martiniquais former footballer who played for as goalkeeper.

International career
Heurlié represented Martinique at the CONCACAF Gold Cup in 2002 and 2003.

External links

1977 births
Living people
People from Le Lamentin
Martiniquais footballers
Martinique international footballers
French footballers
Association football goalkeepers
ES Troyes AC players
2002 CONCACAF Gold Cup players
2003 CONCACAF Gold Cup players
US Raon-l'Étape players
Aiglon du Lamentin players